Martín Flores Bravo (born 21 September 1993) is a Mexican mixed martial artist who competes in the Featherweight division of Combate Global. He has previously competed for the Ultimate Fighting Championship.

Mixed martial arts career

Early career
Bravo made his professional MMA debut in April 2012 in his native Mexico. Over the next four years, he amassed an undefeated record of 10–0 with all but two of his wins coming by way of stoppage.

The Ultimate Fighter Latin America 3
In 2016, it was announced that Bravo would compete on the third season of The Ultimate Fighter Latin America series.

In the elimination round, Bravo defeated Javier Ganin by TKO due to a knee injury in the first round. He was selected to represent Team Griffin under head coach Forrest Griffin. In the quarterfinals, Bravo defeated Ilianovich Chalo by unanimous decision. In the semifinals, he defeated Leonardo Rodríguez by unanimous decision. This win earned him a spot in the finale against fellow finalist Claudio Puelles.

Ultimate Fighting Championship
Bravo made his official UFC debut against Claudio Puelles on November 5, 2016 in Mexico City, Mexico at The Ultimate Fighter Latin America 3 Finale. He won the fight via TKO in the second round in order to be crowned the Lightweight tournament title winner.

In his second fight for the promotion, Bravo faced Humberto Bandenay on August 5, 2017 at UFC Fight Night: Pettis vs. Moreno. He lost the fight via knockout in the first round.

Bravo faced Alex Caceres on July 6, 2018 at The Ultimate Fighter 27 Finale. He lost the fight via split decision. This fight earned him the Fight of the Night award.

Bravo faced Steven Peterson on September 21, 2019 at UFC on ESPN+ 17. He lost the fight by knockout via a spinning back fist in the second round.

Bravo was released by the UFC on February 11, 2020.

Combate Global 
Bravo signed a multifight deal with Combate Global and is expected to make his debut in the main event of Combate Global: Bravo vs. Whitney on September 17, 2021. He won the bout via TKO in the first round.

Bravo faced Jose Estrada on December 3, 2021 at Combate Global: Estrada vs. Bravo. He won the bout within the first round via armbar.

Championships and accomplishments
Ultimate Fighting Championship
 The Ultimate Fighter: Latin America 3 Lightweight Tournament Winner
Fight of the Night (one time)  vs  Alex Caceres

Mixed martial arts record

|-
| Win
| align=center| 13–3
|Jose Estrada
|Submission (armbar)
|Combate: Bravo vs. Estrada
|
|align=center|1
|align=center|1:14
|Miami, Florida, United States
|
|-
| Win
| align=center| 12–3
|Andrew Whitney
|TKO (punches)
|Combate: Bravo vs. Whitney
|
|align=center|1
|align=center|1:09
|Miami, Florida, United States
|
|-
|Loss
|align=center|11–3
|Steven Peterson
|KO (spinning back fist)
|UFC Fight Night: Rodríguez vs. Stephens 
|
|align=center|2
|align=center|1:31
|Mexico City, Mexico
|
|-
| Loss
|align=center|11–2
|Alex Caceres
|Decision (split)
|The Ultimate Fighter: Undefeated Finale 
|
|align=center|3
|align=center|5:00
|Las Vegas, Nevada, United States
|
|-
| Loss
| align=center| 11–1
| Humberto Bandenay
| KO (knee)
| UFC Fight Night: Pettis vs. Moreno
| 
| align=center| 1
| align=center| 0:26
|Mexico City, Mexico
|
|-
| Win
| align=center| 11–0
| Claudio Puelles
| TKO (punches)
|The Ultimate Fighter Latin America 3 Finale: dos Anjos vs. Ferguson
| 
| align=center| 2
| align=center| 1:55
|Mexico City, Mexico
| 
|-
| Win
| align=center| 10–0
| Dallys Moraes Gama
| Decision (unanimous)
| Jungle Fight 81
| 
| align=center| 3
| align=center| 5:00
|Palmas, Brazil
|
|-
| Win
| align=center| 9–0
| Fernando Moya Li
| Submission (rear-naked choke)
| Calvo Promotions 6
| 
| align=center| 1
| align=center| 1:52
|San José, Costa Rica
|
|-
| Win
| align=center| 8–0
| David Suruy
| Submission (rear-naked choke)
| UWC EVT 14
| 
| align=center| 1
| align=center| 2:05
|Tijuana, Mexico
|
|-
| Win
| align=center| 7–0
| Tito Castro
| TKO (punches)
| Xtreme Kombat 30
| 
| align=center| 2
| align=center| N/A
|Guadalajara, Mexico
| 
|-
| Win
| align=center| 6–0
| Jose Ruelas
| Submission (rear-naked choke)
| Pro XFC 1
| 
| align=center| 3
| align=center| 4:32
|Tijuana, Mexico
|
|-
| Win
| align=center| 5–0
| Angel Cruz
| Submission (guillotine choke)
| Baja Cage Fighting: Beach Fights
| 
| align=center| 2
| align=center| 1:03
|Rosarito, Mexico
|
|-
| Win
| align=center| 4–0
| Jaime Flores
| TKO (corner stoppage)
| UWC EVT: Duarte vs. Beristain
| 
| align=center| 2
| align=center| 1:46
|Tijuana, Mexico
| 
|-
| Win
| align=center| 3–0
| Eduardo Garcia
| Decision (unanimous)
| UWC Mexico: New Blood 2
| 
| align=center| 3
| align=center| 5:00
|Tijuana, Mexico
| 
|-
| Win
| align=center| 2–0
| Victor Borrayo
| Submission (armbar)
| UWC Mexico 13: Benitez vs. Oropeza
| 
| align=center| 1
| align=center| 1:43
|Tijuana, Mexico
| 
|-
| Win
| align=center| 1–0
| Abrahan Gallegos
| TKO (punches)
| BCF 3: Battle on the Beach
| 
| align=center| 1
| align=center| 3:57
|Rosarito, Mexico
|

References

External links
 
 

Living people
Mexican male mixed martial artists
Featherweight mixed martial artists
Lightweight mixed martial artists
Mixed martial artists utilizing Brazilian jiu-jitsu
1993 births
Sportspeople from Baja California
Mexican practitioners of Brazilian jiu-jitsu
Ultimate Fighting Championship male fighters